Pituophis lineaticollis, commonly known as the Middle American gopher snake, is a species of nonvenomous snake in the family Colubridae. The species is found in Guatemala and Mexico in the states of Jalisco, Michoacán, Mexico, Morelos, Guerrero, Querétaro, Oaxaca and Chiapas.

Subspecies
 Pituophis lineaticollis gibsoni Stuart, 1954
 Pituophis lineaticollis lineaticollis (Cope, 1861)

References

Colubrids
Snakes of Central America
Snakes of North America
Reptiles of Guatemala
Reptiles of Mexico
Reptiles described in 1861
Taxa named by Edward Drinker Cope